Tommy Douglas Collegiate Institute is a high school located in the Blairmore Suburban Centre district of western Saskatoon, Saskatchewan, serving students from grades 9 through 12. It is named for Tommy Douglas, the "Father of Canadian Medicare," leader of the Saskatchewan Co-operative Commonwealth Federation and premier of Saskatchewan from 1944 to 1961. The school is unique among Saskatoon public schools in that it is the first to be physically connected to both a regional recreation complex (Shaw Centre) and to a Catholic/separate school (Bethlehem Catholic High School).

Its feeder schools are Dundonald School, Ernest Lindner School, Fairhaven School, James L. Alexander School, Lester B. Pearson School, Montgomery School, Wâhkôhtowin School and École Henry Kelsey.

Recreation
A 50-metre swimming pool, fully equipped gym and various other facilities are available in both the school itself and the adjacent Shaw Centre.

Sports

References

External links

2007-08 Saskatchewan Provincial Budget HIGHLIGHTS:
City of Saskatoon · Departments · Infrastructure Services ...
Saskatchewan Invests $30 Million in Innovative Saskatoon School ...
City moves ahead on Blairmore Site
City of Saskatoon · Departments · Community Services · City Planning · ZAM Maps
Populace Spring 2006
Saskatoon Public Schools

High schools in Saskatoon
Educational institutions established in 2007
2007 establishments in Saskatchewan